The , also known as , is a bureau of the Tokyo Metropolitan Government which operates public transport services in Tokyo. Among its services, the Toei Subway is one of two rapid transit systems which make up the Tokyo subway system, the other being Tokyo Metro.

Toei Subway

Light rail lines

In addition to the subways, Toei also operates the Toden Arakawa Line streetcar and the Nippori-Toneri Liner automated guideway transit. It also operated the Ueno Zoo Monorail until its operation was suspended on October 31, 2019.

Bus lines

Toei operates local bus service in central Tokyo, generally to fill in the gaps unserved by the Tokyo Metro and Toei Subway networks.

Most routes are designated by a kanji character followed by a two-digit route number. The initial character usually indicates the main railway station where the line terminates: for instance, 渋66 (Shibu 66) is a suburban route from Shibuya Station. Some routes replace the initial character with Latin letters, one prominent example being the RH01 service between Roppongi Hills and Shibuya. Others use a special character derived from the route, such as 虹01 (Niji [Rainbow] 01) which crosses the Rainbow Bridge. Some cross-town routes begin with the character 都 (to "metropolitan").

Other services
Tokyo Metropolitan Bureau of Transportation also maintains a large fiber optic cable network in the city, as well as several electric power generators.

History

Establishment

The TMEB began bus service in 1924 as an emergency measure after the Great Kantō earthquake knocked out streetcar service in the city. (The TMEB was also responsible for providing electric power to Tokyo, but this service was privatized in 1942 as Tokyo Electric).

In 1942, the Japanese government forced a number of private transit businesses in Tokyo to merge into the TMEB. These included the bus lines of the Tokyo Underground Railway (whose Ginza Line remained independent), the Keio Electric Railway and the Tokyu Corporation, as well as the Oji Electric Tramway (operator of the Arakawa Line) and several smaller bus companies.

In 1943, Tokyo City was abolished and the TMEB's operations were transferred to the new TMBT.

Trolley buses

TMBT operated electric trolley buses between 1952 and 1968 on four routes:

 Route 101: Imai - Kameido - Oshiage - Asakusa - Ueno
 Route 102: Ikebukuro - Shibuya - Naka-meguro - Gotanda - Shinagawa
 Route 103: Ikebukuro - Oji - San'ya - Kameido
 Route 104: Ikebukuro - Oji - Asakusa

The trolley buses were short-lived, however, mostly owing to their vulnerability to weather: rain caused problems with the overhead power supply, and snow required tire chains to be installed on vehicles in order to maintain traction.

Notes

References

External links

 Tokyo Metropolitan Bureau of Transportation (Toei) – official website